The O'Connor House near St. Thomas, North Dakota is a Queen Anne style house that was built in 1898.

It was listed on the National Register of Historic Places in 1990.

It was home of Archie M. O'Connor and his family.  O'Connor was one of the earliest settlers of the area, arriving in 1881.  He had a grain elevator business, and served as Pembina County sheriff during 1888–92.

References

Houses on the National Register of Historic Places in North Dakota
Queen Anne architecture in North Dakota
Houses completed in 1898
Houses in Pembina County, North Dakota
National Register of Historic Places in Pembina County, North Dakota
1898 establishments in North Dakota